Cathedral de San Felipe Apostol may refer to:

Dominican Republic
St. Philip the Apostle Cathedral, Puerto Plata

Puerto Rico
Catedral de San Felipe Apóstol (Arecibo, Puerto Rico)

Venezuela
St. Philip the Apostle Cathedral, San Felipe